Meleh Sorkh (also known as Mīleh Sorkh-e Soflá) is a village in Homeyl Rural District, Homeyl District, Eslamabad-e Gharb County, Kermanshah Province, Iran. At the 2006 census, its population was 283, in 68 families.

References 

Populated places in Eslamabad-e Gharb County